Gordon Jack Kinnell AKC   was an Anglican priest, most notably Provost of St Andrew's Cathedral, Aberdeen from 1932 until 1955.

Kinnell was born on 2 May 1891, educated at King's College London; and ordained in 1916. After  curacies in  Battersea and Clapton he was  Rector of Bearsden. He was the incumbent at  Cupar before his appointment as Provost; and at Buntingford afterwards.

References

1891 births
Alumni of King's College London
Associates of King's College London
Provosts of St Andrew's Cathedral, Aberdeen
Year of death missing